Sir James Skene, Lord Curriehill (1578–1633) was a 17th-century Scottish judge and Senator of the College of Justice.

Life

He was the son of Sir John Skene of Curriehill and Helen Somerville of Cambusnethan. He was born at Curriehill Castle, near Currie south of Edinburgh. He trained as a lawyer in Edinburgh.

In June 1612 he was elected a Senator of the College of Justice and took the title previously used by his father Lord Curriehill. In February 1628, he purchased a baronetcy in Nova Scotia.

Death
He died on 25 October 1633. His gravestone lies on the outer north wall of Greyfriars Kirk in Greyfriars Kirkyard.

Family

He was married to two separate persons each named Janet Johnston (possibly cousins of each other).

He was father to John Skene, Lord Curriehill II who sold Curriehill Castle to a cousin, Samuel Johnston, in 1656.

References

1578 births
1633 deaths
People from Midlothian
Senators of the College of Justice
Baronets in the Baronetage of Nova Scotia